Yazīd ("increasing", "adding more") is an Arabic name and may refer to:

Given name
 Yazid I (647–683), second Umayyad Caliph upon succeeding his father Muawiyah
 Yazid II (687–724), Umayyad caliph
 Yazid III (701–744), Umayyad caliph
 Yazid Kaïssi (born 1981), French-born Moroccan footballer
 Yazid Mansouri (born 1978), French-born Algerian footballer
 Yazid ibn al-Muhallab (672–720), Umayyad governor
 Yazid of Morocco (1750–1792), Sultan of Morocco
 Yazid Sabeg (born 1950), French businessman
 Yazid ibn Abi Sufyan (died 640), brother of the early Umayyad leader Muawiyah I, and companion of Muhammad
 Yazid Sufaat (born 1964), suspected militant
 Yazid Zerhouni (born 1937), Algerian politician
 Zinedine Zidane (Zinedine Yazid Zidane, born 1972), French footballer and manager
 Yazid ibn Umar al-Fazari (died 750)
 Yazid ibn Hatim al-Muhallabi (died 787)
 Yazid ibn Abdallah al-Hulwani, Abbasid military governor of Egypt
 Yazid ibn Mazyad al-Shaybani (died ), Abbasid military general and governor
 Yazid ibn Asid ibn Zafir al-Sulami, Abbasid military general in Armenia
 Yazid ibn al-Sa'iq
 Yazid ibn Jarir al-Qasri
 Yazid ibn Abi Kabsha al-Saksaki
 Yazid ibn Ziyad
 Yazid ibn Khalid al-Qasri
 Yazid ibn Abi Muslim

Surname
 Abu Yazid (873–947), Kharijite Berber of the Banu Ifran tribe
 Mhamed Yazid (1923–2003), Algerian independence activist and politician

See also
 Yazidis, an ethnoreligious group
 Yezidi (script), a historic Kurdish alphabet
 Yezidi (Unicode block), a Unicode block containing letters of the Yezidi script